Upchuck may refer to:
 The act of vomiting

Characters 
 An alien in the animated series Ben 10
 The nickname for the character Charles Ruttheimer from the animated series Daria